Carli Renzi (born 24 October 1982) is an Australian judo competitor and wrestler.  She represented Australia in wrestling at the 2010 Commonwealth Games and the 2012 Summer Olympics in judo in the 52 – 57 kg — Women event.

Personal life
Nicknamed Carli, Renzi was born on 24 October 1982 in East Melbourne, Victoria. She attended St Mary's Primary School, Greensborough  before going to Eltham College of Education. She then attended Deakin University from 2001 to 2005 where she earned a Bachelor of Commerce with Honours in Finance. , she lives in Melbourne, Victoria. While Renzi is primarily a judo and wrestling competitor, other sport disciplines she is involved with include Brazilian Jiu-Jitsu, a sport she took up to help her gain Olympic selection.

Wrestling
Renzi started wrestling in 2007. She represented Australia at the 2010 Commonwealth Games in free-style wrestling, finishing sixth in the U/59 kg division.  Frequently, when men found out Renzi was a wrestler, they asked her if she did mud or jelly wrestling. Going into the 2010 Commonwealth Games, she trained with Emily Bensted.  People at Renzi's place of employment did not believe she was going to the Commonwealth Games to compete in the sport.

Judo
Renzi started in the sport when she was seven years old and initially fought against boys in the mixed U/20 kg division.  She is a member of Dominance Mixed Martial Arts and has a judo scholarship with the Australian Institute of Sport. She was coached by Daniel Kelly and Maria Pekli since 2003. Her primary training base is in Melbourne, with a secondary training base in Canberra.

At the Australian Championships in the 2005, 2006, 2007, 2011 and 2012 Renzi took home gold. She finished 9th in the U/57 kg category at the 2011 Tokyo Grand Slam in Tokyo, Japan. She finished 2nd in the U/57 kg category at the 2011 Apia World Cup in Apia, Western Samoa. She finished 3rd  in the U/57 kg category at the 2011 US Open in Miami. She finished 1st in the U/57 kg category at the 2012 Oceania Championships in Cairns, Australia. She finished 9th in the U/57 kg category at the 2012 Budapest World Cup event in Budapest, Hungary. She was selected to represent Australia at the 2012 Summer Olympics in judo in the 52 – 57 kg — Women event. The Games were her first.  She reached the third round, losing to eventual bronze medalist, Automne Pavia.

References

1982 births
Australian female judoka
Australian female sport wrestlers
Wrestlers at the 2010 Commonwealth Games
Living people
Judoka at the 2012 Summer Olympics
Olympic judoka of Australia
Commonwealth Games competitors for Australia
21st-century Australian women
People from Greensborough, Victoria
People from East Melbourne
Sportspeople from Melbourne
Deakin University alumni
Sportswomen from Victoria (Australia)